Crime Passionel is a 1959 Australian television play. It was based on a play by Jean-Paul Sartre and was directed by Royston Morley.

The play had been broadcast that year by the BBC.

It was broadcast live in Sydney on 11 November 1959. A recording was made of this and shown in Brisbane on 17 November 1959 and Melbourne on 10 February 1960. It went for 90 minutes.

Australian TV drama was relatively rare at the time.

Plot
At the end of World War Two, in the mythical European country of Illythia, the German armies are retreating from the Russians. Hugo, a young intellectual who wants to be revolutionary hero, sets about assassinating Hoederer, leader of the local communist party. Hugo is Hoederer's secretary. Hugo has a wife Jessica, and a fellow party member, Olga.

Cast
Brian James as Hoederer
William Job as Hugo
Jacqueline Kott as Olga
John Fegan as Charles
Tony Arpino as Franz
Peter Williams as Louis 
James Elliott as Ivan
Rosemary Webster as Hugo's wife
Don Crosby as Georges
Julian Flett as Prince Paul
Nat Levison as Slick
Richard Parry as Karsky
Bill Waters as Leon

Production
Brian James was flown in from Melbourne to play the lead.

Reception
The Sydney Morning Herald TV reviewer wrote that the play was "a little slow in movement, because of the sheer weight of its talk... [but] was given an absorbing live performance... the cast was uncommonly strong."

See also
List of live television plays broadcast on Australian Broadcasting Corporation (1950s)

References

External links

1950s Australian television plays
1959 television plays